Kiichirō Kumagai (May 26, 1866 – October 9, 1949) was the first Director of the Karafuto Agency (1905–1907). He was governor of Yamanashi Prefecture (1908–1913) and Ishikawa Prefecture (1914–1915). He was a graduate of the University of Tokyo. He was a recipient of the Order of the Rising Sun. He was from Musashi Province.

1866 births
1949 deaths
Directors of the Karafuto Agency
Governors of Yamanashi Prefecture
Governors of Ishikawa Prefecture
Japanese Home Ministry government officials
University of Tokyo alumni
Recipients of the Order of the Rising Sun, 3rd class
People from Musashi Province